The Arkansas River: From Leadville to Lamar is a 2018 American documentary film about the agricultural, environmental, and recreation aspects of the Arkansas River in the US state of Colorado. The film was written and directed by Samuel Ebersole and produced by Samuel Ebersole and Dustin Hodge.

Content
The film examines the economic impact of recreation and fishing on the Arkansas River. The documentary also examines the needs and issues of the Arkansas River Basin Implementation Plan.

Release
The documentary was released via the PBS. The film also had a number of screenings with panel discussions about water issues.

References

External links
 PBS listing
 
 The Arkansas River: From Leadville to Lamar on Facebook

2018 documentary films
2018 films
2018 television films
American documentary films
Documentary films about water and the environment
Films set in Colorado
2010s English-language films
2010s American films